Kansas's 17th Senate district is one of 40 districts in the Kansas Senate. It has been represented by Republican Jeff Longbine, the current Vice President of the Senate, since his appointment in 2010.

Geography
District 17 stretches from Emporia in the south to the outskirts of Manhattan in the north, covering all of Lyon County and parts of Geary, Pottawatomie, and Wabaunsee Counties. Other communities in the district include Grandview Plaza, most of Junction City, and part of Wamego.

The district is located entirely within Kansas's 1st congressional district, and overlaps with the 51st, 60th, 65th, 68th, and 76th districts of the Kansas House of Representatives.

Recent election results

2020

2016

2012

Federal and statewide results in District 17

References

17
Geary County, Kansas
Lyon County, Kansas
Pottawatomie County, Kansas
Wabaunsee County, Kansas